Nick of Time is a 1995 American political action thriller film produced and directed by John Badham and written by Patrick Sheane Duncan. It stars Johnny Depp, Christopher Walken, Charles S. Dutton, and Courtney Chase. Taking place in real time, the film follows a public accountant who must assassinate a politician in exchange for his kidnapped daughter's freedom. It was released theatrically in the United States by Paramount Pictures on November 22, 1995.

The film was remade into several languages including Hindi,where ShahrukhKhan plays the lead character titled as Baadshah .

Plot
Gene Watson, a mild-mannered, separated and widowed accountant, arrives with his daughter Lynn at Union Station in Los Angeles. As Gene makes a pay phone call informing an unidentified person that his train was late, two mysterious strangers in suits, known only as Mr. Smith and Ms. Jones, survey the station from a catwalk, discussing a yet-to-be-elaborated scheme. Noticing Gene retaliate against a skater who was harassing his daughter, Smith and Jones set their sights on him and swiftly approach the pair. Showing a badge, the two strangers convince Gene that they are police officers and whisk both father and daughter into a van without justification. Once in the vehicle, Gene begins to notice things are not right and gets nervous, but Smith subsequently pistol whips him in the leg to get his attention. Smith then informs Gene that they will kill his daughter by 1:30 p.m. unless he murders a woman depicted in a photograph. He soon learns that the woman is Eleanor Grant, the governor of California, and realizes that killing her would be a suicide mission.

Once at the Bonaventure Hotel, where a number of campaign appearances are being held, Gene makes several attempts to warn people about his situation, but Smith consistently follows him around, taunts and viciously beats him whenever he does not make a move. Gene manages to find a young campaign assistant, Krista Brooks, who believes Gene's story and encourages him to report the matter to the governor's husband, Brendan Grant. Once in his suite, however, Brendan and a campaign lobbyist appear to disbelieve the story, and before anything more can be said, Smith shows up in the room and fatally shoots Krista, causing a tense scuffle between Gene and Smith. Gene awakens after unconsciousness and finds nearly everyone on the campaign, including the governor's staff and husband, are involved in the plot, with an unnamed lobbyist masterminding it all in revenge for the governor not carrying out her campaign promises to his interests.

Gene eventually finds a disabled war veteran named Huey who polishes people's shoes at the hotel. While at first he does not believe the man's story, Smith talks to Gene about the plot, believing Huey to be completely deaf according to a sign. Huey reluctantly assists Gene to get to Governor Grant's suite and advise her of the conspiracy. Although skeptical at first of Gene's story, she later notices Brendan act suspiciously about Krista's whereabouts and realizes Gene was telling the truth. Being hastened by her husband to make the last speech, the governor greets supporters in a ballroom when Gene takes out the gun, points it at a projector room where Smith is watching him and shoots at the window. This unleashes a panic in the ballroom, causing a stampede and brief shootout between Gene and the security people. Thinking that his wife is dead, Brendan openly gloats about the plot's success, only to find out in horror that she had heard everything, confirming her suspicions about him.

In the meantime, Huey stalls the armed Jones, who is in the van with Lynn after she cannot get a signal from Smith. He then annoys her with a squeegee man scheme to the point of a violent confrontation in which she shoots his wooden leg. Lynn quickly tries to get out of the van when Smith opens the door and begins to shoot at her. Right after she hides under the seat, Gene appears and shoots Smith. Ailing from his wounds, Smith congratulates Gene for becoming a killer just before he's finally killed by him. Before Jones can get a clear shot at the father and daughter, Huey beats her unconscious with his prosthetic leg and wing tip shoe. The final scene shows the conspiracy mastermind stepping on Gene's broken wristwatch and leaving the hotel in a car.

An alternate TV scene (and on some DVD versions) also shows the governor thanking Gene and Huey for saving her life.

Cast
 Johnny Depp as Gene Watson
 Christopher Walken as Mr. Smith
 Charles S. Dutton as Huey
 Roma Maffia as Ms. Jones
 Marsha Mason as Gov. Eleanor Grant
 Peter Strauss as Brendan Grant
 Gloria Reuben as Krista Brooks
 G.D. Spradlin as The Lobbyist
 Bill Smitrovich as Officer Trust
 Yul Vazquez as Gustino
 Edith Diaz as Irene
 Courtney Chase as Lynn Watson

Production

Filming
The majority of filming took place at the Westin Bonaventure Hotel in Downtown Los Angeles, California.

Reception

Box office
A box office bomb, it grossed $8 million on a $33 million budget.

Critical reception
Nick of Time received mostly negative reviews from critics. Based on 33 reviews collected from notable publications by review aggregator Rotten Tomatoes, the film holds an overall approval rating of 30% and an average score of 4.6/10. The site's consensus reads: "It isn't the worst '90s action thriller, but by bungling a story pitting Johnny Depp against Christopher Walken, the rote Nick of Time ranks among the most disappointing". Audiences polled by CinemaScore gave the film an average grade of "B" on an A+ to F scale.

A more positive review came from Roger Ebert in The Chicago Sun-Times who gave the film 2.5 stars out of 4. He wrote the film was "too contrived" in places, but lauded Depp's performance as bringing "a low-key ordinariness" and liked his character's use of intelligence rather than action film cliches to solve his dilemma.

Soundtrack
The film's score – composed by Arthur B. Rubinstein – was released by Milan Records on November 22, 1995.

References

External links
 

1995 films
American neo-noir films
1995 action thriller films
1995 crime thriller films
1990s English-language films
1990s political thriller films
American action thriller films
American crime thriller films
American political thriller films
Films about father–daughter relationships
Films about hostage takings
Films about kidnapping
Films about assassinations
Films directed by John Badham
Films scored by Arthur B. Rubinstein
Films set in hotels
Films set in Los Angeles
Films shot in Los Angeles
Paramount Pictures films
1990s American films